The following are the national records in track cycling in Estonia maintained by Estonia's national cycling federation: Estonian Cycling Federation.

Men

Women

References

External links
 Estonian Cycling Federation web site
 Estonian records

Records
Track cycling
Track cycling records
Estonia